Happyendless is a Lithuanian new wave, rock and electronic band formed in Vilnius in 1998. In 2007, the band released their "Power Forever" single and became one of the most popular bands in Lithuania at the time. Their first studio album Room For Mistakes was released in 2008, followed by Cinema in 2011. After the departure of their  lead singer, Saulius Prūsaitis, who left to pursue a solo career in 2012, the band entered a hiatus until 2018, when the remaining members reunited and recorded the band's third album Kinetika (Kinetics).

Band members 
 Andrius Kauklys (1998–present)
 Marius Narbutis (1998–present)
 Saulius Prūsaitis (2005–2012)
Darius Vaičiulis (1999–2006)

Discography

Studio albums
 2008 – Room For Mistakes
 2011 – Cinema
2018 – Kinetika
2020 - Utopia

Singles
 2007 – "Power Forever"
 2008 – "Hello Come On"
 2008 – "No Tomorrow"
 2009 – "Sweet Sweet Super Sweet"
 2010 – "Golden Olympic"
 2016 – "Gravitacija"

Compilation albums 

 2002 – Akvariumas

Awards and nominations 

Lithuanian electronic musicians
Lithuanian new wave musicians
Lithuanian rock music groups
21st-century Lithuanian musicians